{{Infobox television
| image                =
| num_episodes         = 153
| genre                = TelenovelaRomanceDrama
| creator              = Delia Fiallo
| writer               = 
| starring             = María Conchita AlonsoJorge Schubert
| opentheme            = "Piel y seda" by María Conchita Alonso & Ilan Chester"Embustero" by María Conchita Alonso
| endtheme             = 
| theme_music_composer = 
| language             = Spanish
| country              = Venezuela
| runtime              = 
| company              = 
| location             = 
| channel              = RCTV
| audio_format         = 
| picture_format       = NTSC
| first_aired          = 
| last_aired           = 
| executive_producer   = Carlos Lamus
| producer             = Hernando Faría
| director             = Luis Manzo
| cinematography       = 
| camera               = 
| editor               = 
| related              = Rafaela (1977)Roberta (1987)Rafaela (2011) 
}}Alejandra is a Venezuelan telenovela produced by Radio Caracas Television in 1994 based on the telenovela Rafaela written by Cuban writer Delia Fiallo.

María Conchita Alonso and Jorge Schubert starred as the protagonists.

Plot
Alejandra Martínez is a beautiful and intelligent young woman who has dedicated her life to the medical profession in order to rise above her humble origins. She believes children are a burden and source of obstacles, as happened with her mother Caridad Martínez who had 5 children from different men, believing that men could save her from her loneliness, but all left her. After a year of medical internship and social work in the rural areas of her country, Alejandra returns to her neighborhood in Caracas where she gets a job at a local hospital. There, she will face the director, famous surgeon Alejandro Antúnez where she reveals to him that she is his illegitimate daughter and she is determined to prove she does not need him to succeed. Everyone at the hospital, including Alejandro, respect Alejandra, except for  Luis Jose Báez, a medical intern from  Argentina who is macho and a womanizer. The attraction between Alejandra and Luis José will be hidden under the constant conflicts they have. But after a brief relationship, Alejandra discovers she is pregnant, thus repeating her mother's story.

Mireya, the wife of Luis José, arrives in Caracas from Argentina to win her husband back. Obsessed with the fear that Luis José will abandon her because she is older than him, she has spent years playing with his emotions making him believe he is to blame for the death of their son although she was the one who provoked an abortion. Discovering Alejandra is expecting her husband's child, she looks for ways to eliminate her. She seeks the support of Morela, the selfish and arrogant wife of Alejandro Antúnez. Morela always knew about Alejandra's existence, but never told her husband so that he could pay more attention to their daughter Alicia, a  repressed child who ends up falling into alcoholism.

Cast

María Conchita Alonso as Alejandra MartínezJorge Schubert as Luis José BáezRaquel Montero as Mireya de BáezManuel Escolanoas AlfredoCecilia Villarreal as Morela de AntúnezRaúl Xiquéz as Alejandro AntúnezOswaldo Mago as Víctor AcuñaAlicia Plaza as IleanaReina Hinojosa as GiselaAna Castell as Caridad MartínezEduardo Gadea Pérez as DiógenesAngélica Herrera as Belén MartínezRicardo Bianchi as Raúl HerreraFélix Loreto as PorfirioLoly Sánchez as Rosalba MartínezEricka Medina as Alicia AntúnezRafael Romero as Chucho MartínezFlor Elena González as Domitila FonsecaAntonio Machuca as TulipánIván Tamayo as Carlos Alberto MedinaHaydi Velázquez as Arelis Bustamante de MedinaLaura Términi as NiurkaFranchesca Términi as LulyJuan Carlos Láres as ChamitoNelson Bustamante as Nelson BustamanteRosario Prieto as María de BustamanteEsperanza Magaz as RosarioTania Sarabia as IsabelVersions
In 2011, Televisa in Mexico produced their own version titled Rafaela'' starring Scarlet Ortiz and Jorge Poza.

References

External links

1994 telenovelas
RCTV telenovelas
Venezuelan telenovelas
1994 Venezuelan television series debuts
1994 Venezuelan television series endings
Spanish-language telenovelas
Television shows set in Venezuela